Sehar Kamran is a Pakistani politician who was a member of the Senate of Pakistan from March 2012 to March 2018.

Education
She holds the degree of Bachelor of Arts which she received from the University of Karachi in 1987. During her studies at the University of Karachi, she served as President of Peoples Students Federation,  the student wing of the Pakistan People's Party.

Career

Kamran joined the Pakistan International School Jeddah – English Section (PISJ-ES), located in Jeddah, Saudi Arabia, as principal in 1999.

In 2012, Pakistan Peoples Party (PPP) decided to award her ticket for contesting in the 2012 Pakistani Senate election. While serving as principal of the school, she was elected to the Senate of Pakistan as a candidate of PPP on reserved seats for women in 2012 Pakistani Senate election. Then secretary of the Election Commission of Pakistan said that if Kamran was continuing her job as principal of the school after her election as a senator, her act was unconstitutional and illegal. Raja Zafar-ul-Haq, then Leader of the Senate of Pakistan criticised Kamran for holding two public service positions saying that "she did not disclose she was the principal of a school when she elected to the Senate" and added that "Pakistani law forbids a senator from holding another public service job."

She remained principal of the school until November 2013 when she was sacked from her position by Pakistan's Ambassador to Saudi Arabia Muhammad Naeem Khan, reasons cited were corruption and nepotism. She allegedly spent 170,000 Saudi riyals of school funds on a vehicle for personal use.  

In 2014, the National Accountability Bureau (NAB) filed a corruption reference against Kamran and decided to probe into the allegation in coordination with the Ministry of Foreign Affairs. However, Foreign Office refused to cooperate with the NAB. Reportedly, Kamran used her political connections to not let the case proceed against her.  In January 2016, The High Court of Sindh granted her protective-cum-transitory bail in NAB inquiry pertaining to corruption.

She continued to serve as Senator till completion of her six-year term in 2018. PPP decided to not give her ticket for contesting in the 2018 Pakistani Senate election.

References

Living people
Pakistani senators (14th Parliament)
Pakistan People's Party politicians
Year of birth missing (living people)
21st-century Pakistani women politicians
University of Karachi alumni